Robert Earl Davidson (February 10, 1912 – September 26, 1996) was a Canadian professional ice hockey left winger who played 12 seasons in the National Hockey League for the Toronto Maple Leafs.

Playing career 
Davidson on occasion went by the nickname "Rugged Robert" by his teammates. He played his entire NHL career with the Toronto Maple Leafs.  He played in the NHL from 1933–34 to 1945–46. He played on two Stanley Cup winning teams. His first was in 1941–42 and his second in the 1944–45 season in which he was the Maple Leafs' captain. Davidson served as captain of the Maple Leafs from 1943–44 to 1944–45.

After his playing days were over he stayed on with the Maple Leafs in a number of different capacities. His most notable was as chief scout.

Davidson is considered by many to be one of the best hockey scouts of all time and was credited with building the Toronto Maple Leafs teams during the 1960s which dominated the NHL by winning the Stanley Cup four times (1961–62, 1962–63, 1963–64, 1966–67) within a six-year period. His name was engraved on the cup for 1962 and 1967, though was a member of all four cups wins by Toronto in the 1960s.

In 1995 the board of directors of the Maple Leafs organization awarded Davidson with the J. P. Bickell Memorial Award.

Career statistics

Regular season and playoffs

See also 
List of NHL players who spent their entire career with one franchise

External links 
Picture of Bob Davidson's Name on the 1945 Stanley Cup Plaque
 
{{center|

1912 births
1996 deaths
Canadian ice hockey left wingers
Ice hockey people from Toronto
Pittsburgh Hornets coaches
St. Louis Flyers coaches
Stanley Cup champions
Syracuse Stars (IHL) players
Toronto Maple Leafs players
Toronto Maple Leafs scouts
Toronto Marlboros players
Canadian ice hockey coaches